The Pluckemin Village Historic District is a   historic district located along U.S. Route 206 and Burnt Mills Road in the Pluckemin section of Bedminster Township in Somerset County, New Jersey. The district was added to the National Register of Historic Places on July 26, 1982, for its significance in architecture, commerce, education, and religion. It includes 33 contributing buildings.

Selected contributing properties

See also
 National Register of Historic Places listings in Somerset County, New Jersey

References

External links

 

National Register of Historic Places in Somerset County, New Jersey
Georgian architecture in New Jersey
Greek Revival architecture in New Jersey
Italianate architecture in New Jersey
Historic districts on the National Register of Historic Places in New Jersey
Bedminster, New Jersey
New Jersey Register of Historic Places